Leonard Charles Eshmont (August 26, 1917 – May 12, 1957) was an American football halfback and defensive back for the New York Giants of the National Football League (NFL) and the San Francisco 49ers, then in the All-America Football Conference (AAFC).

From Atlas near Mount Carmel, Pennsylvania, Eshmont played college football at Fordham University in The Bronx; as a senior in 1940, he led the Rams to a 7–1 regular season record and a berth in the Cotton Bowl, which they lost by a point to sixth-ranked Texas A&M.

Eshmont was selected by the New York Giants in fifth round of the 1941 NFL Draft, 36th overall. He served in the U.S. Navy during World War II and then played for the 49ers from 1946 to 1949, and scored the first touchdown in franchise history.

After his playing career ended, Eshmont was an assistant coach at the U.S. Naval Academy under Eddie Erdelatz. He moved to the University of Virginia in 1956 under new head coach Ben Martin, whom he had coached with at Navy.

Eshmont died at age 39 in 1957 of infectious hepatitis at the University Hospital in Charlottesville, Virginia, where he had been a patient for his final three months. The 49ers created The Len Eshmont Award, the team's most prestigious annual honor, which is given to the Niner who best exemplifies the "inspirational and courageous play" of Eshmont.

See also
 List of NCAA major college football yearly rushing leaders

References

External links
San Francisco 49ers – Len Eshmont Award

1917 births
1957 deaths
American football running backs
American football defensive backs
Del Monte Pre-Flight Navyators football players
Fordham Rams football players
Navy Midshipmen football coaches
New York Giants players
North Carolina Pre-Flight Cloudbusters football players
San Francisco 49ers (AAFC) players
Virginia Cavaliers football coaches
People from Mount Carmel, Pennsylvania
Players of American football from Pennsylvania
Deaths from hepatitis
Infectious disease deaths in Virginia
United States Navy personnel of World War II
United States Navy officers
Military personnel from Pennsylvania
San Francisco 49ers players